Ohrid St. Paul the Apostle Airport, also known as Ohrid Airport, is an international airport in Ohrid, North Macedonia. The main purpose of St. Paul the Apostle Airport is to serve as a second airport in North Macedonia and alternative to Skopje International Airport and cater to flights bringing in tourists destined for Ohrid.

History
The last runway reconstruction was performed in 2004, when a lighting system, a first category with simple approach lights, was installed. Other features enable takeoff, landing and maneuvering with different types of aircraft.

In 2008, the Macedonian Government signed a contract with the Turkish company Tepe Akfen Ventures (TAV) for a twenty-year-long concession during which this company would manage Macedonia's two existing airports in Ohrid and Skopje. Ohrid airport saw its terminal building and VIP sections modernized.

Facilities
The airport can accommodate small to medium-sized aircraft. The apron can park up to 9 aircraft and the terminal is equipped to handle up to 400,000 passengers annually. Among other amenities the terminal building encompasses an information desk, a restaurant, a duty-free shop, and a VIP lounge.

There is no arrivals lounge. The local public await the passengers outside the building.

Airlines and destinations
The following airlines operate regular scheduled and charter flights at Ohrid St. Paul the Apostle Airport:

Statistics

The number of passengers at the airport is shown in the next table:

Ground transportation

There are currently no buses linking the airport with Ohrid city centre. The normal taxi fare for the 9-km ride is 12 euros or 730 denars.

Incidents and accidents

 On 20 November 1993, Avioimpex Flight 110, a Yak 42D crashed near the airport. The aircraft was on a flight from Geneva, Switzerland to Skopje, but had been diverted to Ohrid due to poor weather conditions. All eight crew members and 116 passengers died as a result of the accident. 115 died at the scene, the final victim died from injuries in hospital eleven days later.

References

External links
 Ohrid Airport Homepage

Airports in North Macedonia
Debarca Municipality
Ohrid